Gracia–Orlová is a women's staged cycle race which takes place in the Moravian-Silesian Region of the Czech Republic and in the Silesian Voivodeship of Poland. It was created in 1987.

Since 2004, it starts in Dětmarovice. A mountain stage is competed in Kuźnia Raciborska. The finish to the final stage is located in Orlová.

Honours

Jerseys 
As of the 2013 edition:
 denotes the rider leading the race overall
 denotes the rider leading the Points classification
 denotes the rider leading the Mountains classification
 denotes the rider leading the Sprints classification

External links 
 
 Honours of Gracia-Orlová at cyclingarchives.com

Cycle races in the Czech Republic
Cycle races in Poland
Recurring sporting events established in 1987
Sport in Silesian Voivodeship
1987 establishments in Czechoslovakia
1987 establishments in Poland
Gracia-Orlová
Women's road bicycle races
Spring (season) events in the Czech Republic
Spring (season) events in Poland